Françoise Lugagne (1914–1991) was a French stage, film and television actress. She was married to the Belgian actor Raymond Rouleau and appeared alongside him in the 1945 fashion house drama Paris Frills as his spurned love interest.

Filmography

References

Bibliography
 Philippe Rège. Encyclopedia of French Film Directors, Volume 1. Scarecrow Press, 2009.

External links

1914 births
1991 deaths
French television actresses
French film actresses
French stage actresses
Actresses from Marseille
20th-century French actresses
Signatories of the 1971 Manifesto of the 343